Christabell Stembeni Mahlungwa (born April 15, 1995), professionally known as Kikky Baddass, is a Zimbabwean rapper and singer-songwriter. She gained notoriety in 2017 after the release of the raunchy video to "Body Conversations", a song which is featured on her debut album titled Queen of The South.

Early life and education
Kikky was born in Harare, Zimbabwe. She completed her basic education at Avondale Primary School. She went on to complete her secondary education at Trust Academy in Harare. She is currently studying sociology  at the Midlands State University.

Career
In October 2017, Kikky released her debut album called "Queen of The South" which featured Ycee from Nigeria and Zimbabwean rappers Marcus Mafia and Jnr Brown and production by WizzyProbeatz.
In 2018 she released a five track EP titled "Mambokadzi" which features zimdancehall artist, Freeman on a track called "Rewind"

Tiara Baluti dispute
In 2017 Kikky Baddass engaged in a lyrical war with female rapper Tiara Baluti which resulted in diss songs such "Strive Masiiwa" by Kikky and Mash It Up by Tiara. The beef started after Tiara was interviewed on Capital 26Free's Keep It Real Fridays, she said she wouldn't work with Kikky on a song and Kikky reacted by going on Instagram live and Twitter where she called Tiara arrogant and that she should stay in her lane.

Discography

Albums
Queen of The South (2017)
Bloodline (2020)

EPs
Mambokadzi (2018)

Awards and nominations

See also

List of Zimbabwean musicians

References

1995 births
Living people
People from Harare
Zimbabwean rappers
Zimbabwean musicians